James Michael Seymour (born  July 27, 1949 in Fresno, California) is a retired American track and field athlete.  He was a silver medalist in the 400 metres hurdles at the 1971 Pan American Games behind Ralph Mann.  He also represented the USA at the 1972 Olympics where he finished in fourth place, about a meter behind the silver and bronze medalists Ralph Mann and David Hemery and more than a second faster than the 5th, 6th and 7th placers Rainer Schubert, Yevgeny Gavrilenko and Stavros Tziortzis , but about 6 meters behind gold medalist John Akii-Bua's world record.  Seymour ran for the University of Washington, finishing fourth in the 1971 NCAA Championships, then third at the 1971 National Championships.  After college he ran for the Southern California Striders.

References

Living people
1949 births
American male hurdlers
Athletes (track and field) at the 1972 Summer Olympics
Athletes (track and field) at the 1971 Pan American Games
Olympic track and field athletes of the United States
University of Washington alumni
Track and field athletes from California
Pan American Games medalists in athletics (track and field)
Pan American Games silver medalists for the United States
Medalists at the 1971 Pan American Games